Nancy Snow is an American professor and scholar of propaganda and public diplomacy. She has authored, edited or co-edited fifteen books, including Propaganda, Inc.: Selling America's Culture to the World, an overview of American cultural policy that includes a foreword by Herbert Schiller and introduction by Michael Parenti; and Information War: American Propaganda, Free Speech and Opinion Control since 9-11.

Education 
Snow graduated summa cum laude with a B.A. in political science from Clemson University.

Snow holds a Ph.D. in International Relations from American University School of International Service (SIS) where she concentrated in international/intercultural communication, peace and conflict resolution studies, and U.S. foreign policy.

In 2020 Snow held the Walt Disney Faculty Chair in Global Media and Communication in the Schwarzman Scholars Program at Tsinghua University in Beijing.

References 

California State University, Fullerton faculty
American non-fiction writers
American University School of International Service alumni
University of California, Berkeley alumni
Clemson University alumni
20th-century American women writers
Year of birth missing (living people)
Living people
Propaganda theorists
21st-century American women